Aruana is a genus of jumping spiders that was first described by Embrik Strand in 1911.  it contains only two species, found only in Papua New Guinea and on the Aru Islands: A. silvicola and A. vanstraeleni.

References

Salticidae
Salticidae genera
Spiders of Oceania
Taxa named by Embrik Strand